Bydlin  is a village in the administrative district of Gmina Klucze, within Olkusz County, Lesser Poland Voivodeship, in southern Poland.

The village has a population of 990. Religions: Roman Catholicism (The Church),
 Jehovah's Witnesses (Kingdom Hall).

References

Bydlin